Mahasiva was an early monarch of Sri Lanka of the kingdom of Anuradhapura, based at the ancient capital of Anuradhapura from 257 BC to 247 BC according to historical records. Mahasiva was one of the many sons of Mutasiva and also brother of monarchs Devanampiya Tissa, Uttiya and Asela.

See also
 List of Sri Lankan monarchs

External links 
 Kings & Rulers of Sri Lanka
 Codrington's Short History of Ceylon

Monarchs of Anuradhapura
3rd-century BC Sinhalese monarchs
M
 Sinhalese Buddhist monarchs
M